Jesse C. Johnson Jr. (born March 2, 1959) is an American environmental and political activist, actor, and filmmaker from West Virginia. Johnson has thrice run for Governor of West Virginia and twice for West Virginia's Class 1 U.S. Senate seat, running in 2006 and again in the special election in 2010.

Life and career
Born in Charleston, West Virginia, Johnson attended Marshall University, North Carolina School of the Arts, the University of Charleston, and West Liberty University. He is a member of the Screen Actors Guild, Actor's Equity, AFTRA, and SAG's Native American Registry and has worked with both the Directors Guild of America and the Writers Guild of America.

Political campaigns
In 2004, Johnson was the Mountain Party nominee for governor in order to maintain the party's newly-won ballot line and to bring the issue of mountain top removal to statewide attention. He received 2.5% of the vote.

In 2006, Johnson was the Mountain nominee West Virginia’s US Senate election. He campaigned against corporate influence of the elections. Johnson neither took nor spent money, focusing on the need for campaign finance reform. He received 1.9% of the vote. 

In 2008, Johnson sought the Green Party nomination for president and won his home state of West Virginia in the Green primaries. He received the endorsement of former United States Senator and former 2008 presidential candidate Mike Gravel, among others.  At the 2008 Green National Convention, Johnson lost the nomination to former Congresswoman Cynthia McKinney.

In 2008, he again ran for governor. His campaign was endorsed by the Sierra Club and the Citizens Action Committee.  He received 21,472 votes (3.99% of the vote).

In the 2010 special election for the late Robert Byrd's Senate seat in West Virginia, his opponents were Joe Manchin, the Democratic Party nominee, who won the seat; John Raese, the Republican Party nominee; and Jeff Becker, the Constitution Party nominee.  Johnson was endorsed by former Democratic Congressman Ken Hechler to fill the seat.

Johnson was the Mountain Party’s nominee in the 2012 West Virginia gubernatorial election. He finished third in a field of four.

References

External links
Jesse Johnson for WV Governor official campaign site 2012
Radio Interview with Pat LaMarch, November 2012
Johnson Video Gallery 2012
Article October 2012
Third Party Candidates who run for office 2012
 
Campaign contributions at OpenSecrets.org
Candidate profile: Jesse Johnson at Project Vote Smart
Green Party Minneapolis Presidential Forum January 12, 2008
Speaking at Membership Meeting Minneapolis Minn. January 11, 2008

1959 births
Living people
Marshall University alumni
University of Charleston alumni
West Liberty University alumni
American environmentalists
Candidates in the 2008 United States presidential election
21st-century American politicians
Mountain Party politicians
Politicians from Charleston, West Virginia